"Can You Handle It" is a song by American singer Sharon Redd. It was released in 1980 as the first single from her self-titled debut album (1980). It charted on the US Billboard Dance and R&B charts, and at No. 31 in the UK.

Charts

DNA version

In 1992, English production duo DNA released a remix of the song, credited as DNA featuring Sharon Redd, which appeared on their debut album, Taste This (1992). This version reached No. 17 in the UK and also charted in Finland, Ireland, New Zealand and the Netherlands.

Charts

References

1980 songs
1980 singles
1992 singles
Sharon Redd songs
DNA (duo) songs
Prelude Records (record label) singles
Epic Records singles
EMI Records singles